George Best (1555–1584) was a member of the second and third Martin Frobisher voyages in positions of importance; as Frobisher's lieutenant on the second and as captain of the Anne Francis on the third. In 1578 he published A True Discourse of the Late Voyages of Discoverie.

Life
He was the son of Robert Best, an interpreter for the Muscovy Company, and Anne Bowman, and the brother of the sea captain Thomas Best, and Henry who may have been involved in works based on the True Discourse. Sir Christopher Hatton as backer nominated Best to take part in one of the Frobisher voyages.

Best was killed in a duel with Oliver St. John, later Lord Deputy of Ireland, around March 1584. The precise motive for the duel is unclear, but it was most likely provoked by the bad-tempered St. John, who called himself "the child of wrath".

Works
The True Discourse discussed the First Frobisher Voyage, in which Best did not participate, as well as the other two (1577 and 1578) where he was an eye-witness. It appeared in the exploration collection of Richard Hakluyt. Later, in reprinting the material, Hakluyt removed some passages, in particular one suggesting that the aim of the exploration was prospecting for minerals, rather than the North-West Passage.

Notes

External links 
 

1584 deaths
Canadian explorers
16th-century Canadian people
English explorers
English chroniclers
16th-century English writers
16th-century male writers
Duelling fatalities
English duellists
1555 births